Aalami Sahara (Urdu :عالمی سمے) is an Urdu 24/7 news television channel, owned by Sahara India Pariwar. The channel is a free-to-air and launched on 27 December 2010. The channel is available across all major cable and DTH platforms as well as online.

See also
 Sahara India Pariwar
 Sahara Samay Channel
 Sahara One

References

Television channels and stations established in 2004
Urdu-language television channels in India
Television stations in Hyderabad